Mochlus somalicus, also known as the Somali writhing skink, is a species of skink. It is found in Somalia, Ethiopia, Kenya, and Tanzania.

References 

Mochlus
Skinks of Africa
Reptiles of Ethiopia
Reptiles of Kenya
Reptiles of Somalia
Reptiles of Tanzania
Reptiles described in 1942
Taxa named by Hampton Wildman Parker